Karabti San is a village in Djibouti. It is located northwest of Djibouti City.

References

Populated places in Djibouti